Dayhoff is a surname. Notable people with the surname include:

Harry Dayhoff (1896–1963), American football player
Margaret Oakley Dayhoff (1925–1983), American physical chemist and bioinformatician
Ruth Dayhoff (born 1952), American physician and bioinformatician, daughter of Margaret
Richard Paul Dayhoff (born 1959), American fraud examiner and auditor, son of Paul